Isaac Eduasar Edumadzi (1 January 1957, Central Region — 11 January 2018, Cape Coast) was a Ghanaian politician and a member of the New Patriotic Party. He was the Member of Parliament for the Ejumako/Enyan/Essiam in the Central region. He served under the administration of the former president John Agyekum Kufour in the fourth parliament of the fourth Republic of Ghana.

Political career 
Isaac Edumadze was first elected into Parliament on the ticket of the New Patriotic Party during the General Elections for the Ejumako/Enyan/Essiam constituency in the Central Region of Ghana. He polled 15,660 votes out of the 34,953 valid votes cast representing 32.10% over his opponents Joseph K.Enos an NDC member who polled 14,839 votes, Lawrence Yaw Awuah a CPP member who polled 3,672 votes and Joseph Mensah a PNC member who polled 782 votes. He contested in 2000 and won with 15,336 votes out of the 30,500 valid votes cast representing 50.30% over his opponents Mary Padmore Dadzie an NDC member who polled 12,681 votes, Kwame Adomako-Mensah a NRP member who polled 1,314 votes, Jonathan Siliman Otabil a CPP member who polled 747 votes, Robert Anthony Gyaisie a PNC member who polled 307 votes and Kojo Banafo a UGM member who polled 115 votes.

He was a member of the New Patriotic Party. He was appointed the Central Regional Minister inFebruary 2001 by J.A Kufour. He became a member of parliament from January 2005 after winning the General Election in December 2004 Ghanaian general election. He was elected as the member of parliament for the Ejumako/Enyan/Essiam constituency in the fourth parliament of the fourth Republic of Ghana under His excellency former J.A Kufour's administration. He obtain a total vote cast of 21,534 which represent 57.80% whiles his opponents candidates, Samuel Aggrey Forson of the National Democratic Congress pulled 14,474 representing 38.80% of the votes, Kwame Asoandze Edu-Ansah of the Convention People's Party obtained 1,276 also representing 3.40% of the vote cast while James Appiah-Mensah an independence candidate had no vote making him, Isaac Edumadze, emerge as the winner of the Ejumako/Enyan/Essiam constituency. Isaac also represented his constituency in the 2nd Parliament of the 4th Republic. He was elected after he was pronounced winner of the 1996 Ghanaian General Elections.

Personal life 
He was a well known farmer in the Ajumako area in the central region and a devoted Christian as well.

Death 
He was reported to have died on 11 January 2018 in the Cape Coast Teaching Hospital in the afternoon. He had been known to be not in a good condition and was rushed to the hospital only to last a few minutes longer.

References 

Ghanaian MPs 2005–2009
New Patriotic Party politicians
Ghanaian accountants
Ghanaian Christians
People from Central Region (Ghana)
1957 births
2018 deaths
Ghanaian MPs 1997–2001
Ghanaian MPs 2001–2005
Ghanaian agriculturalists